Zachary Taylor (1784–1850) was the president of the United States from 1849 to 1850.

Zachary Taylor may also refer to:
 Zachary Taylor (priest) (1653–1705), English parish priest known for his controversial writings
 Zachary Taylor (Tennessee politician) (1849–1921), former U.S. Representative from Tennessee
 Zachary Taylor (baseball), American first baseman in the National Association for the 1874 Baltimore Canaries
 SS Zachary Taylor, a Liberty ship
 Zack Taylor (baseball) (1898–1974), American Major League Baseball player
 Zac Taylor (born 1983), former college football quarterback and current NFL coach for the Cincinnati Bengals
 Zac Taylor (singer) (born 1993), New Zealand singer and member of band Titanium
 Zack Taylor (celebrity blogger), Canadian blogger
 Zack Taylor, a character in the Power Rangers universe
 Zack Taylor (Oklahoma politician), member of the Oklahoma Senate